Sylte is a village along the Frænfjorden in Hustadvika Municipality in Møre og Romsdal county, Norway.

References

Hustadvika (municipality)
Villages in Møre og Romsdal